Brian Gregory (born 11 January 1955) was a Northern Irish footballer. He made one Football League appearance for Gillingham and was also briefly on the books of Luton Town but spent most of his career playing non-league football.

References

Association footballers from Northern Ireland
Association footballers from Belfast
1955 births
Living people
Margate F.C. players
Gillingham F.C. players
Luton Town F.C. players
Weymouth F.C. players
Ebbsfleet United F.C. players
Dover Athletic F.C. players
Crawley Town F.C. players
Bromley F.C. players
Association footballers not categorized by position